Neil Hlavaty (born December 27, 1986) is a former American soccer player who is currently an assistant coach for Forward Madison FC.

Career

College and Amateur
Hlavaty attended Glenbard East High School in Lombard, Illinois, played club soccer for the Chicago Sockers, was a five-year member of the Illinois Olympic Development Program team, and trained with the AC Sparta Prague youth team in the Czech Republic during the spring of 2005.

Hlavaty played three years of college soccer at Boston University. He was selected to the NSCAA All-Northeast Region Second Team and named America East Midfielder of the Year as a junior, and was also selected to the All-America East First Team after his sophomore and junior seasons. after starting in all of BU's 19 matches.

During his college years Hlavaty also played two seasons with Chicago Fire Premier in the USL Premier Development League.

Professional
Hlavaty signed with Cleveland City Stars of the USL Second Division in late 2007, helping the squad win the USL-2 title in his debut season. After the 2008 campaign, during which Hlavaty recorded 3 assists in 15 matches, he transferred to Swedish outfit Östers for six months.

In October 2009, Hlavaty signed with Polish side Jagiellonia Białystok, and subsequently played in 2 games for the team in the Ekstraklasa in 2009.

On February 25, 2010, Hlavaty returned to the United States when he signed with the NSC Minnesota Stars of the USSF Division 2. He re-signed with the club, now playing in the North American Soccer League, on March 22, 2011.

On November 21, 2012 FC Edmonton announced the signing of Hlavaty for the 2013 season.

On January 9, 2015, Hlavaty signed with NASL club Carolina RailHawks. After one season with Carolina, Hlavaty was traded to Fort Lauderdale Strikers on December 30, 2015, in exchange for James Marcelin. In 2017 he signed on with the Myrtle Beach Mutiny.

Coaching
On January 8, 2019, it was announced that Hlavaty had joined Forward Madison FC as an assistant coach.

Personal
Hlavaty is of Czech and Polish descent.

Honors 

Jagiellonia Białystok
Polish Cup: 2009/10

 Minnesota Stars FC
North American Soccer League:
 Champion 2011
 Finalist 2012

References

External links
 Boston bio 
 

1986 births
Living people
American soccer players
American expatriate sportspeople in Poland
Association football midfielders
Boston University Terriers men's soccer players
Chicago Fire U-23 players
Cleveland City Stars players
Expatriate footballers in Poland
Expatriate footballers in Sweden
FC Edmonton players
Jagiellonia Białystok players
Minnesota United FC (2010–2016) players
Myrtle Beach Mutiny players
North American Soccer League players
North Carolina FC players
Östers IF players
People from Lombard, Illinois
Richmond Kickers players
Soccer players from Illinois
Sportspeople from DuPage County, Illinois
USL League Two players
USSF Division 2 Professional League players
American soccer coaches
People from Berwyn, Illinois